"Looks Like We Made It" is a song by American singer Barry Manilow, from his 1976 album, This One's for You, composed by Richard Kerr with lyrics by Will Jennings. It was released as a single on 20 April 1977.

Overview
The song was first released in 1976 on his album This One's For You, and was issued as a single in 1977 where it reached the number one spot on both the U.S. Billboard Hot 100, and the U.S. Adult Contemporary chart.  It is ranked as the 37th greatest U.S. hit of 1977.  It became his third of five gold records.

Despite the optimism suggested by the song's title, the narrator is actually ruminating on the fact that he and his ex-lover have finally found happiness and fulfillment—though not with each other. They have, indeed, "made it," but apart, not together. Songwriter Will Jennings commented,

Reception
Cash Box called it "a stately ballad with a sad story," saying that it "reverberates with a gargantuan choir that pushes to a towering, dynamic finale."

Chart performance

Weekly charts

Year-end charts

Track listing
 7" AS 0244
 "Looks Like We Made It" – 3:33
 "New York City Rhythm (Live)"

Other recordings
 Facts of Life on their 1977 album Facts of Life
 Christopher Wheat on his 2013 album Breaking the Waves

See also
 List of Hot 100 number-one singles of 1977 (U.S.)
 List of number-one adult contemporary singles of 1977 (U.S.)

References

External links
 

1976 songs
1977 singles
Barry Manilow songs
Billboard Hot 100 number-one singles
Songs with lyrics by Will Jennings
Songs written by Richard Kerr (songwriter)
Song recordings produced by Ron Dante
Arista Records singles